Nico Liersch (born 17 July 2000) is a German actor. He is best known for his role as Rudy Steiner in the 2013 film The Book Thief. He is also known for his work in the German television series Das ist Gut where he played Phillip Greenyard, a caveman without parents.

Early life
Liersch was born on 17 July 2000 in Munich, Germany, where he was raised.

Career
Nico started acting at the age of seven, when he appeared in a McDonald's Happy Meal commercial with Kai Pflaume. In 2008, he also appeared in a supporting role in Der Einsturz. 

In 2012, Liersch appeared in episodes of the German TV series Inga Lindström and Das Traumhotel, then later feature film Kokowääh 2, a sequel to Kokowääh. In February 2013, he was cast in the film adaptation of the best-selling novel The Book Thief. He played Rudy Steiner, the best friend of the titular book thief, Liesel Meminger. Markus Zusak, who wrote the novel that inspired the movie, was pleased with Nico's portrayal of his character and wrote: ¨He's magnificent, indeed. He is Rudy.¨

Filmography

References

External links

German male child actors

2000 births

Living people